Hayward's Lott, also known as Ivy Hall, is a historic home located at Pocomoke City, Somerset County, Maryland, United States. It is a -story farmhouse built about 1730 of Flemish bond brickwork with glazed headers. The house features small windows in the principal elevations, a steeply pitched roof, and two interior "T"-shaped chimneys.

Hayward's Lott was listed on the National Register of Historic Places in 1976.

References

External links
, including undated photo, at Maryland Historical Trust

Houses in Somerset County, Maryland
Houses on the National Register of Historic Places in Maryland
Houses completed in 1730
National Register of Historic Places in Somerset County, Maryland